The Challenge: War of the Worlds 2 is the thirty-fourth season of the MTV reality competition series The Challenge, and the sequel to the show's 33rd season, War of the Worlds, which aired in the spring of 2019. This season features alumni from The Real World, The Challenge, Are You the One?, Big Brother, Celebrity Big Brother UK, Love Island UK, Survivor Turkey, American Ninja Warrior, Vanderpump Rules, Geordie Shore, Ex on the Beach (U.S. and UK), Shipwrecked, Survival of the Fittest, and BKCHAT LDN competing for a share at a $1 million prize. The season premiered on August 28, 2019 and concluded its run on December 18 of the same year with a two-hour reunion special.

Contestants

Format
For War of the Worlds 2 the players are divided into two teams (Team USA and Team UK) with teams initially based on the participants' respective home country. The main elements of the game are as follows.

Daily Missions: Each round the teams compete in the daily challenge. The winning team gains the power to elect the speaker of the Tribunal among themselves, the speaker then selects two other teammates (one male and one female) to form the Tribunal, while the losing team must participate in Nominations.
Nominations: Following the daily challenge, the players from the losing team must nominate one player of the designated gender to compete in the elimination round. The team is given a chance to discuss the nominations, with players allowed to name potential nominees before voting between them publicly. 
Tribunal: Each round a Tribunal consisting of three players from the winning team of the daily challenge is formed. The Tribunal players are the only players completely safe from entering the elimination. No player is allowed to be part of two consecutive Tribunals. The Tribunal witnesses the Nominations and then interrogates the Losing Team's nominee - usually asking potential players the nominee would like to face-off against.
Eliminations (The Proving Ground): At "The Proving Ground", the members of the Tribunal each vote for the second player to enter the Proving Ground - this nominee may come from either team. The two nominees then must face each other in the Proving Ground. The loser is eliminated from the game while the winner stays in the game and is given the opportunity to change allegiance and swap team. However, once a player swaps, they may not swap back.

At the end of the game, those who remained competed in their teams in the Final Challenge. A Purge was held during the Final Challenge, leaving only 4 players from each team to compete for the Grand Prize. The winning team equally split the $1,000,000 grand prize ($250,000 for each member).

Twists
The Reinforcements: Four Reinforcements (Chris "CT" Tamburello, Dee Nguyen, Natalie "Ninja" Duran, and Turabi "Turbo" Çamkıran) arrived following the first challenge. The winning team of the first daily challenge will have first picks on one male and one female to join their team, with the remaining players joining the losing team.
Double Elimination: Episode 8 featured a Double Elimination Round in which both a male and a female player were eliminated. The losing team had to nominate a male and female player, and the Tribunal also nominate a male and female player.
Purge:  Some challenges will be designated as a Purge challenge - sudden death challenges where the losers are immediately eliminated.
 The "Puzzling Swim" daily challenge was a Purge challenge. The slowest pairing in the swimming portion of the challenge was instantly eliminated.
  As the final leg of the Final Challenge only allowed for four members on each team, the players competed in a mid-final purge to narrow each team to four players.
 Instant Elimination: Following the "Mine The Cart" challenge, the players participated in instant nominations for an Elimination Round to be held immediately following the challenge.

Gameplay

Challenge games
Trench Warfare: Teams must race through a hallway, grab their national flag at the opposite end, reach the other side of their sandbag walls and plant the flags. Each player is responsible for two flags, and can only carry one at a time. The first team to plant all 28 flags wins.
 Winners: Team USA
Cryptic Crossbow: Challengers swim to collect 16 letters attached to buoys, which will create a four-word puzzle. One team member is then launched from a giant crossbow to swim and retrieve a cryptex puzzle and solve it using their four-word puzzle solutions. The team that opens their cryptex first wins.
 Winners: Team USA
Paddlewheel Puzzle: After memorizing four-digit codes, players enter a rotating paddlewheel to collect 16 separate puzzle pieces which can be unlocked by entering one of the codes. Challengers then assemble those puzzle pieces into either an American or British flag. The fastest team to correctly build their puzzle wins the challenge.
 Winners: Team USA
Relic Runner: Played in two heats. Giant, heavy relics must be transferred from the bottom of the hill to the very top by one team, while the other team is situated at the top with giant balls, a slingshot, water cannon, and a human hamster wheel to bomb the team that's running the relics up. Each player is responsible for two relics, and can only carry one at a time, guaranteeing two trips up the hill for everyone. If a player drops their relic, they have to start from the very beginning. Whichever team finishes in the fastest time wins.
 Winners: Team UK
Hooked: Each player has to jump to a zip line and ride it to the water, then swim around a buoy and reach a boat. The team with the fastest average time wins.
 Winners: Team USA
Explosive Decisions: Both teams select their six smartest players to be asked a series of trivia questions while sitting on an ejection seat that will make them fly in the air if the answer is wrong. The player is awarded a point only if his or her adversary is wrong. The first team to reach a total of six points wins.
 Winners: Team USA
Resilient River Run: Each team has to assemble a pyramid, transport it down a river and use it to transfer two relics (carrying one at a time). Whichever team finishes in the fastest time wins.
 Winners: Team USA
Crate Expectations: Both teams are given 125 crates which they must use to build towers to climb and retrieve 12 hanging relics. Once all relics have been collected, they must transport all their crates past the finish line. The first team to pass the finish line with all their crates and relics wins.
 Winners: Team USA
Under Siege: Played in gender divided heats. Both teams are placed inside of a swinging container and must solve a hexagonal puzzle. The team that completes the puzzle in the fastest time (in whichever heat) wins. In the event of a tie, a sudden death heat is played with some of the pieces already set in place.
 Winners: Team USA
Incoming: Played in gender divided heats. Competitors must retrieve a ball from a mud pit and return to their side to advance to the next round, while the number of balls decreases each round. The last player standing wins the heat for his or her team. The first team to win two heats wins. 
 Winners: Team UK
Temple Wall Traverse: Teams are divided in half and start on opposite sides of a climbing wall above water. Competitors must match as many tiles labelled with Roman numerals to their position on the wall, while members of the opposite team use a series of hand cranks to separate the walls to make them more difficult to climb. The team with the most tiles matched after fifteen minutes wins.
 Winners: Team USA
Escape To Freedom: Played in gender divided heats. One at a time, competitors attempt to complete an obstacle course dragged by a boat and ring a bell at the end without falling in the water. At a section of the course, there is a defender from the opposing team attempting to stop them from finishing. The team with the most players to finish the course within the time limit wins.
 Winners: Team USA
Puzzling Swim: Teams start on a platform in the water and swim in pairs to retrieve a total of four keys that unlock a riddle and letter tiles. The first team to identify the answer to the riddle wins. Additionally, the slowest swimming pair from either team would be eliminated immediately.
 Winners: Team USA
 Eliminated: Joss & Kayleigh
Mine The Cart:  One male and one female from each team are suspended in a cart above the water. They must wheel the cart to collect as many medallions as possible, while a member from the opposing team swims and collect a saw to cut through the ropes connected to their cart. Once the rope is cut, players inside the cart will be tipped out and cannot collect medallions anymore. The team with the most medallions after three rounds wins.
 Winners: Team UK

Proving Ground games
 Pole Wrestle: Players are placed at the center of a circle and are asked to place both hands on a pole. The first contestant to wrestle the pole out of his opponent's hands two out of three times wins. Originally from The Duel.
 Played by: Idris vs. Sean
 Firestarter: Players push a cart full of rocks with a lit torch toward their opponent's fuse. Whoever lights their opponent's fuse first wins.
Played by: Big T vs. Georgia
 Firing Squad: T.J. Lavin shoots a ball from a cannon, the players then have to wrestle the ball from each other and deposit it into their basket for a point. The first player to get to two points wins.
Played by: Bear vs. Wes
 Branched Out: Players must climb a tree by placing 21 branch-like pegs in slots. The first player to correctly place all the pegs and ring the bell at the top wins.
Played by: Laurel vs. Ninja
 Die For Me: Players are locked in a cube-shaped cage with a bag of numbered balls. They must then roll the cage down a path with seven landmines with Roman numerals on them, placing the numbered balls corresponding to the landmines. The first player to correctly place all the balls in the landmines and detonate the eight landmine at the end of the pathway wins.
Played by: Bananas vs. Theo
 Trapped: Players start at the top of a platform and must slide down a glass tower into a ball pit where a puzzle key is hidden. Players must memorize the puzzle key, shimmy back up the glass tower and put their puzzle together. The first player to complete the puzzle wins.
Played by: Jenny vs. Nicole
 Whalloped: Players stand at opposite ends of six walls. When the horn sounds, players run around the walls until they meet in the middle where they have to get through or around their opponent to the other side and ring the bell. The first player to ring the bell first three times wins.
Played by: Bear vs. Joss
 Running Riot: Players are given two answer keys and must retrieve 25 relics with their weight corresponding to the numbers. The player who retrieves all 25 relics and places them in the exact order wins.
Played by: Esther vs. Georgia, Kyle vs. Theo
 Break Free: Players must use a rope to swing and break through a dry wall to reach a three-dimensional puzzle. The first player to solve their puzzle wins.
Played by: Idris vs. Theo
 Blockbuster: Players push blocks to their opponents side of a structure while trying not to fall off. The contestant who pushes the most blocks within the time limit two out of three times wins.
Played by: Georgia vs. Tori
Under the Hammer: Players use sledgehammers to hit 12 nails through concrete and smash the lightbulbs underneath. The first player to break all 12 lightbulbs wins.
Played by: Jordan vs. Theo
Hall Brawl: Players must run through a narrow hallway past another contestant to ring a bell. The player who rings the bell first twice, wins the elimination. Originally from Battle of the Seasons (2012).
Played by: Jenny vs. Tori
End of the Rope: Players begin standing on a small platform and pull on a rope that is buried underground. The first player to retrieve all of the rope or pull their opponent off the platform three times wins.
Played by: Jordan vs. Josh
Run for Your Life: Players are given a box with four puzzle pieces inside. They must carry two puzzle pieces at a time and run up a mountain to a structure where their puzzle station is. After they collect all four pieces, the first person to complete their puzzle wins.
Played by: Ashley vs. Nany

Final Challenge

Day one
First Stage: Each team begins with a gurney equipped with a relic and twenty pounds of sandbags for each member of the team. Each team must complete a sixteen-mile race while carrying the gurney (with the weight on top), undergoing checkpoints every four miles along the course. Only four members of each team can carry the gurney at once however players may switch out at checkpoints. Once each checkpoint is complete, teams run to their respective boat to be transported to the overnight stage of the final. The first team to finish receives a five-minute headstart for the final leg.

Checkpoint 1 (Leverage Up): Using a catapult, each team must fire three coconuts into a basket.
Checkpoint 2 (Number Crunch): Each competitor must correctly answer a math question using numbers from a number board.
Checkpoint 3 (Basket Ballin'): Each competitor has three attempts to land a ball into a basket. Players who fail to land the ball in the basket must consume a bowl consisting of skewered scorpion with insects, as well as consume a live grub worm from a shot glass.
Checkpoint 4 (Pyramid Scheme): Each team must complete a triangular puzzle before moving on to the finish line of the first leg. Teams are also free to move on should they time-out after reaching a maximum time limit.

Note: Both teams incurred a ten-minute penalty during the first leg; Team UK for CT knocking the Team USA gurney and causing carriers to stumble off the track, and Team USA for carrying the weight by hand and switching out carriers between checkpoints.

Overnight Stage: After swimming to shore from their team boat, each team is provided with one bed located inside a snake pit. One member from each team may sleep on the bed at a time, while other members of the team must stand on a set of stairs outside of the snake pit.

Day two
Mid-Final Purge: Each player competed in a mid-final purge the following morning. Each player individually race to complete a puzzle, run down to the beach and swim to their respective team boat. The first four players from each team to reach their team boat (regardless of gender) advance to the final leg while the remaining players are eliminated.
Eliminated: Ashley, Kam, Leroy (Team USA)
Eliminated: Tori (Team UK)

Second Stage (Chain Gang): Each team is attached by a chain around their ankles. They must then complete a six-mile run while chained before completing a puzzle (or timing out the designated time limit). Teams must then kayak to a yacht offshore, the first team to have all four members reach the yacht is declared the winning team of War of the Worlds 2.
Winners: Team UK (CT, Dee, Jordan, Rogan) — $1,000,000 ($250,000 each)
Runners-Up: Team USA (Cara Maria, Ninja, Paulie, Zach) — $0

Game summary

 Team USA
 Team UK
Bold indicates the speaker of the team.

Elimination progress

Teams
 The contestant is on Team USA
 The contestant is on Team UK
 The contestant began as a Reinforcement
Competition
 The contestant's team won the final challenge
 The contestant's team lost the final challenge
 The contestant was eliminated during the final challenge
 The contestant's team won the daily challenge, was in the Tribunal, and was safe from elimination.  Bold indicates the speaker of the team.
 The contestant was not chosen to go into the Proving Ground
 The contestant was put into the Proving Ground and won
 The contestant was put into the Proving Ground and was eliminated
 The contestant was eliminated for finishing last in the daily challenge
 The contestant was disqualified from the competition due to disciplinary reasons
 The contestant withdrew from the competition

Voting history

Teams

Episodes

Reunion special
The two part reunion special aired on December 18, 2019 and was hosted by Justina Valentine and NBA Champion Nick Young. Cast members attended in London, England. The first part received 0.64 million viewers along with a 0.4 18–49 demo rating, while the second part dropped to 0.54 million and a 0.3 demo rating.

Notes

References

External links
 

2019 American television seasons
War of the Worlds, The Challenge
Television shows set in Thailand
Television shows filmed in Thailand